Dudman (also Romanized as Dūdmān and Doodman; also known as Qal‘eh Dūdmān) is a village in Qarah Bagh Rural District, in the Central District of Shiraz County, Fars Province, Iran. At the 2006 census, its population was 344, in 99 families.

References 

Populated places in Shiraz County